Colin Ryan, professional name of Colin Santisuk Green (born 23 June 1986) is an English actor, best known for the BBC's series Leonardo as a young Lorenzo de' Medici, as Harry in Doctor Who Series 10 'Knock Knock', and as the voice of Alphinaud Leveilleur in Final Fantasy XIV from the Heavensward expansion onward.

Early life and education
Ryan was born in Birmingham, England, on 23 June 1986. His father is from Birmingham and his mother is Thai and Chinese.

Ryan trained at Arts Educational Schools, London, and graduated in 2009. His first job after graduation was with Rufus Hound in sci-fi comedy Hounded for CBBC. He also did the pilot for BBC Switch comedy Shelfstackers.

Career
Stage roles at drama school include Caiaphas the Elder and Simon the Zealot in The Last Days of Judas Iscariot, Weinberl in On the Razzle and Ariel in The Tempest.

Other stage credits include the Ghost of Christmas Past at Birmingham REP and I Was Looking at the Ceiling and Then I Saw the Sky, a contemporary opera at Theatre Royal Stratford East. The story takes place in the aftermath of the 1994 earthquake in Los Angeles, and covers the reactions of all characters to the event. The main characters are seven young Americans all living in Los Angeles but from different social and ethnic backgrounds. In 2011, he was cast as Lorenzo de' Medici in the program Leonardo. The first series of Leonardo was shot on location in South Africa throughout the second half of 2010. A second series was completed on location in Cape Town and aired in 2012.

Work

Television

Video games

Theatre

References

External links
 

Living people
1986 births
English male television actors
English male stage actors
21st-century English male actors
English male video game actors
English male voice actors
English people of Thai descent
English people of Chinese descent 
British male actors of Chinese descent
Male actors from Birmingham, West Midlands
People educated at the Arts Educational Schools